Lambsheim-Heßheim is a Verbandsgemeinde ("collective municipality") in the district Rhein-Pfalz-Kreis, in Rhineland-Palatinate, Germany. The seat of the Verbandsgemeinde is in Lambsheim. It was formed on 1 July 2014 by the merger of the former Verbandsgemeinde Heßheim and the formerly independent municipality Lambsheim.

The Verbandsgemeinde Lambsheim-Heßheim consists of the following Ortsgemeinden ("local municipalities"):

*seat of the Verbandsgemeinde

References

Verbandsgemeinde in Rhineland-Palatinate